The Golden Dragon Cannon was a type of cannon with a short barrel, made of bronze or iron, used exclusively by the Emperor of Qing Dynasty when he led his own troops into battles (御驾亲征).

History
In the 19th year of Kangxi (1680), the Golden Dragon Cannon made of bronze was produced.

In the 25th year of Kangxi (1686), the Golden Dragon Cannon made of iron was manufactured.

References

Cannon
17th century in China
17th-century weapons
Artillery of China
Military history of the Qing dynasty